Adriano Panatta (born 9 July 1950) is a former professional tennis player from Italy. He won the French Open in 1976, and was the only player ever to defeat Björn Borg at Roland Garros, doing so on two occasions. He is also the only Italian man to win a men's singles Grand Slam title in the Open Era.

He is currently a regular guest of the RAI broadcast Quelli che... il Calcio from 2018 to 2021. He's an atheist.

Career
Panatta was born in Rome. His father was the caretaker of the Tennis Club Parioli, and as a youngster he learned to play the game on the club's clay courts. He became a successful European junior player before turning professional.

In his early career, Panatta won top-level professional titles at Bournemouth in 1973, Florence in 1974, Kitzbühel and Stockholm in 1975.

The pinnacle of his career arrived in 1976, when he won the French Open defeating Harold Solomon in the final 6–1, 6–4, 4–6, 7–6. In the first round he had saved a match point against Czechoslovakian player Pavel Hutka. In the same year he also won the Italian Open, having saved 11 match points in his first round match against the Australian Kim Warwick, and beating Guillermo Vilas in the final (2–6, 7–6, 6–2, 7–6). He finished off 1976 by helping Italy capture its first-ever Davis Cup title, winning two singles and a doubles rubber in the final against Chile. He reached his career-high singles ranking of world No. 4 that year.

Panatta is the only player to have defeated Björn Borg at the French Open. He achieved this feat twice – in the fourth round in 1973 (7–6, 2–6, 7–5, 7–6), and in the quarterfinals in 1976 (6–3, 6–3, 2–6, 7–6). He also faced Borg at the semifinal stage of the 1975 tournament; Borg won on this occasion in four sets.

In 1977, Panatta won the World Championship Tennis in Houston, where he defeated Jimmy Connors and Vitas Gerulaitis. He followed this up with another title in Tokyo in 1978.

Panatta was less successful on fast surfaces. On grass courts, he reached the quarterfinals at Wimbledon in 1979. He was beaten at that stage by Pat Du Pré in five sets (3–6, 6–4, 6–7, 6–4, 6–3).

After the 1976 Davis Cup triumph, Panatta helped Italy reach the Davis Cup final on three further occasions – in 1977, 1979 and 1980. The team lost to Australia in 1977, the United States in 1979, and to Czechoslovakia in 1980. Overall, Panatta compiled a 64–36 Davis Cup record (55–17 on clay).

His final career singles title came in 1980 at Florence. He retired from the professional tour in 1983. Since retiring as a player, Panatta has served as captain of Italy's Davis Cup team, and as tournament director of the Rome Masters. He is also a professional powerboat racer.

Grand Slam finals

Singles (1 title)

Career finals

Singles: 26 (10–16)

Doubles: 28 (18–10)

Singles performance timeline

Other sports
Panatta was driver of offshore powerboat racing in world championships, category in which he would have graduated world champion in 1990 had it not been for the fact that the world title that year was not awarded for mourning following the tragic death in competition of Stefano Casiraghi, husband of the Caroline, Princess of Hanover. Furthermore, from 1992 (42 years old) until 2002 (52 years old), Panatta was also a rally driver, arriving in 1992 to compete in a round of the World Rally Championship, the Sanremo Rally in a Peugeot 309 GTI.

See also
 Tennis in Italy

References

External links
 

1950 births
Living people
Italian male tennis players
Italian motorboat racers
Italian rally drivers
French Open champions
Tennis players from Rome
Grand Slam (tennis) champions in men's singles
Mediterranean Games bronze medalists for Italy
Mediterranean Games medalists in tennis
Competitors at the 1971 Mediterranean Games
Italian atheists